Friedrich, Duke of Schleswig-Holstein-Sonderburg-Glücksburg (23 October 1814 in Schleswig, Schleswig – 27 November 1885 in Luisenlund, Schleswig-Holstein, Prussia, Germany) was the third Duke of Schleswig-Holstein-Sonderburg-Glücksburg. Friedrich was the second-eldest son of Friedrich Wilhelm, Duke of Schleswig-Holstein-Sonderburg-Glücksburg and Princess Louise Caroline of Hesse-Kassel and an elder brother of Christian IX of Denmark. Friedrich inherited the title of Duke of Schleswig-Holstein-Sonderburg-Glücksburg upon his childless brother Karl's death on 14 October 1878.

Marriage and issue
Friedrich married Princess Adelheid of Schaumburg-Lippe, second-eldest daughter of George William, Prince of Schaumburg-Lippe and his wife Princess Ida of Waldeck and Pyrmont, on 16 October 1841 in Bückeburg, Schaumburg-Lippe. Friedrich and Adelheid had five children: 
Princess Marie Karoline Auguste Ida Luise of Schleswig-Holstein-Sonderburg-Glücksburg (27 February 1844 – 16 September 1932), married Prince William of Hesse-Philippsthal-Barchfeld.
Friedrich Ferdinand Georg Christian Karl Wilhelm, Duke of Schleswig-Holstein (12 October 1855 – 21 January 1934).
Princess Luise Karoline Juliane of Schleswig-Holstein-Sonderburg-Glücksburg (6 January 1858 – 2 July 1936), married George Victor, Prince of Waldeck and Pyrmont.
Princess Marie Wilhelmine Luise Ida Friederike Mathilde Hermine of Schleswig-Holstein-Sonderburg-Glücksburg (31 August 1859 – 26 June 1941).
Prince Albert Christian Adolf Karl Eugen of Schleswig-Holstein-Sonderburg-Glücksburg (15 March 1863 – 23 April 1948).

Honours
 :
 Grand Cross of the Dannebrog, 22 May 1840
 Knight of the Elephant, 18 September 1843
 Cross of Honour of the Order of the Dannebrog, 18 September 1843
  Ascanian duchies: Grand Cross of Albert the Bear, 7 November 1852
  Electorate of Hesse: Knight of the Golden Lion
 : Knight of St. Anna, 1st Class

Ancestry

References

Bibliography 
 Wilhelm Horst: Die Entstehung und Entwicklung der Freimaurerlogen in Schleswig-Holstein., Ludwig 2004, p. 138.
 John C. G. Röhl: Wilhelm II. Der Aufbau der Persönlichen Monarchie 1888–1900., C.H.Beck 2012, .

External links

1814 births
1885 deaths
People from Schleswig, Schleswig-Holstein
Dukes of Schleswig-Holstein-Sonderburg-Glücksburg
Princes of Schleswig-Holstein-Sonderburg-Glücksburg
House of Schleswig-Holstein-Sonderburg-Beck
Recipients of the Cross of Honour of the Order of the Dannebrog
Grand Crosses of the Order of the Dannebrog
Recipients of the Order of St. Anna, 1st class